The Kroton Hela Wigmen is a semi professional Papua New Guinean rugby league team from Hela Province. They currently compete in the Papua New Guinea National Rugby League Competition. They have been playing their home games in Port Moresby while waiting for their new stadium to be completed in 2022, the New stadium will be based in the Hela Province capital of Tari.

In 2014, they won the Digicel Cup, beating the Agmark Gurias 34-8 in the grand final in Lae. They won their second premiership title in 2020.

2022 squad

Honours

League
PNGNRL Digicel Cup
Winners (2): 2014, 2020,
Runners up (1): 2019,

See also

References

Papua New Guinean rugby league teams
Hela Province